Antonio Lanfranchi (17 May 1946 – 17 February 2015) was a Roman Catholic archbishop.

Ordained to the priesthood in 1971, Lanfranchi was named bishop of the Diocese of Cesena-Sarsina, Italy, in 2003. In 2010, he was named archbishop of Modena-Nonantola. He died while still in office.

Notes

1946 births
2015 deaths
Italian Roman Catholic archbishops